The 2003 NHL Entry Draft was the 41st NHL Entry Draft. It was held at the Gaylord Entertainment Center in Nashville, Tennessee on June 21 and 22, 2003.

Goaltender Marc-Andre Fleury was selected first overall by the Pittsburgh Penguins. This was only the third time a goalie was selected first overall in the draft, after Michel Plasse in 1968 and Rick DiPietro in 2000. Eric Staal was selected second, by the Carolina Hurricanes, and Nathan Horton was the third selection, by the Florida Panthers.

Many analysts rate this draft as having one of the most talented groups of players, some say even better than the 1979 NHL Draft. Every first-round pick went on to play in a regular season NHL game. Among those, two played only a handful of games: Hugh Jessiman (2 games) and Shawn Belle (20). All other first round picks had much more substantial NHL careers: the third-fewest games was Marc-Antoine Pouliot with 192. Fleury, Staal, Horton, Nikolay Zherdev, and Patrice Bergeron all became NHL regulars immediately after they were drafted. Milan Michalek was expected to do the same, and was selected for the San Jose Sharks' NHL roster after training camp, but suffered a serious knee injury that ruled him out for the season. All of the top ten selections played at least nine games in the NHL in the 2005–06 season. Calgary Flames' first round selection Dion Phaneuf scored 20 goals in his rookie campaign, becoming the third defenceman to do so, after Brian Leetch and Barry Beck. Mike Richards and Jeff Carter (Flyers), Zach Parise (Devils), Ryan Getzlaf (Ducks), and Eric Staal (Hurricanes) all led their teams in scoring in the 2007–08 regular season, and Dustin Brown (Kings) went on to break the record for most Stanley Cups won by an American team captain (two, in 2012 and 2014).

Later rounds of the draft also featured more players than usual that went on to have substantial NHL careers. These included Shea Weber (49th overall pick), Corey Crawford (52nd), David Backes (62nd), Jimmy Howard (64th), Clarke MacArthur (74th), Jan Hejda (106th), Paul Bissonnette (121st), Kyle Quincey (132nd), Lee Stempniak (148th), Nigel Dawes (149th), Marc Methot (168th), Nate Thompson (183rd), Drew Miller (186th), Joe Pavelski (205th), Kyle Brodziak (214th), Tobias Enstrom (239th), Dustin Byfuglien (245th), Shane O'Brien (250th), Matt Moulson (263rd), Jaroslav Halak (271st), David Jones (288th), and Brian Elliott (291st).

Draft day trades
The following trades were made on the day of the draft:
 The Florida Panthers traded the first pick (which was later used to select Marc-Andre Fleury) and 73rd pick (Daniel Carcillo) to the Pittsburgh Penguins for the third pick (Nathan Horton), the 55th pick (Stefan Meyer) and Mikael Samuelsson.
 The Boston Bruins traded the 16th pick (Steve Bernier) to the San Jose Sharks for the 21st pick (Mark Stuart), the 66th pick (Masi Marjamaki), and the 107th pick (Byron Bitz)
 The Edmonton Oilers traded the 17th pick (Zach Parise) to the New Jersey Devils for the 22nd pick (Marc-Antoine Pouliot) and the 68th pick (Jean-Francois Jacques).
 The St. Louis Blues traded Cory Stillman to the Tampa Bay Lightning for the 62nd pick (David Backes).
 The New Jersey Devils traded Mike Danton and the 101st pick (Konstantin Zakharov) to the St. Louis Blues for the 93rd pick (Ivan Khomutov).
 The Chicago Blackhawks traded Andrei Nikolishin to the Colorado Avalanche for the 120th pick (Mitch Maunu)
 The St. Louis Blues traded Tyson Nash to the Phoenix Coyotes for the 148th pick (Lee Stempniak)

Final central scouting rankings

Skaters

Goaltenders

Selections by round

Round one

Round two

Round three

Round four

Round five

Round six

Round seven

Round eight

Round nine

Draftees based on nationality

See also
 2003–04 NHL season
 List of NHL first overall draft choices
 List of NHL players

References

External links 
 2003 NHL Entry Draft player stats at The Internet Hockey Database

Draft
National Hockey League Entry Draft